Eureka is a city in Juab County, Utah, United States. It is part of the Provo–Orem metropolitan area. The population was 669 at the 2010 census, down from 766 in 2000.

The city was named from the Greek word eureka, meaning "I have found it!"

Geography
Eureka is located in northern Juab County at  (39.954974, -112.116364). The northeast boundary of the city is the Utah County line, following the height of land. Packard Peak is to the north, while  Godiva Mountain and  Eureka Ridge are to the south.

U.S. Route 6 forms Main Street through Eureka, leading east  to Santaquin and southwest  to Delta.

Climate
This climatic region is typified by large seasonal temperature differences, with warm to hot (and often humid) summers and cold (sometimes severely cold) winters.  According to the Köppen Climate Classification system, Eureka has a humid continental climate, abbreviated "Dfb" on climate maps.

Demographics

As of the census of 2000, there were 766 people, 271 households, and 197 families residing in the city. The population density was 521.4 people per square mile (201.2/km2). There were 342 housing units at an average density of 232.8 per square mile (89.8/km2). The racial makeup of the city was 97.65% White, 1.04% Native American, 0.13% Asian, 0.13% Pacific Islander, 0.26% from other races, and 0.78% from two or more races. Hispanic or Latino of any race were 2.35% of the population.

There were 271 households, out of which 39.1% had children under the age of 18 living with them, 56.8% were married couples living together, 8.9% had a female householder with no husband present, and 27.3% were non-families. 24.0% of all households were made up of individuals, and 13.7% had someone living alone who was 65 years of age or older. The average household size was 2.83 and the average family size was 3.37.

In the city, the population was spread out, with 33.2% under the age of 18, 9.1% from 18 to 24, 27.7% from 25 to 44, 18.8% from 45 to 64, and 11.2% who were 65 years of age or older. The median age was 30 years. For every 100 females, there were 103.2 males. For every 100 females age 18 and over, there were 102.4 males.

The median income for a household in the city was $36,875, and the median income for a family was $43,077. Males had a median income of $35,938 versus $26,563 for females. The per capita income for the city was $14,534. About 6.3% of families and 9.9% of the population were below the poverty line, including 10.5% of those under age 18 and 12.2% of those age 65 or over.

Mining history
Eureka was originally known as Ruby Hollow before it developed into a bustling mining town. Incorporated as a city in 1892, Eureka became the financial center for the Tintic Mining District, a wealthy gold and silver mining area in Utah and Juab counties. The district was organized in 1869 and by 1899 became one of the top mineral-producing areas in Utah. The Eureka Micropolitan Statistical Area housed the "Big Four" mines—Bullion Beck and Champion, Centennial Eureka, Eureka Hill, and Gemini-and later the Chief Consolidated Mining Company.

Eureka's role as the central financial point for the district ensured its survival. It housed business establishments, including the second-ever JCPenney store (then called the Golden Rule Store), financial institutions, local and county governmental buildings including Eureka City Hall (1899) and a Juab County Courthouse (1892), various churches, and the meeting places for numerous labor, social, and fraternal organizations. Mining entrepreneurs such as John Q. Packard, John Beck (who personally funded the construction of the Eureka LDS Church Meetinghouse in 1902), Jesse Knight, and Walter Fitch Sr. were important figures in Eureka and Tintic history. In the early 1900's, Eureka was a powerhouse in the state when it came to soccer. They won the state title in 1905, 1907 and 1909. In 1979, Eureka was placed in the National Register of Historic Places as part of the Tintic Mining District Multiple Resource Area, recognizing the importance of remaining buildings and sites.

Notable person
 Frank Zamboni, inventor of the modern ice resurfacer and founder of Zamboni Company

See also

 List of municipalities in Utah
 National Register of Historic Places listings in Juab County, Utah
 Tintic High School
 Tintic Standard Reduction Mill

References

External links

Eureka, Utah
Historic districts on the National Register of Historic Places in Utah
Mining communities in Utah
Populated places established in 1870
Cities in Juab County, Utah
Provo–Orem metropolitan area
National Register of Historic Places in Juab County, Utah
Populated places on the National Register of Historic Places
1870 establishments in Utah Territory